Vida Jane Mary Goldstein (pron. ) (13 April 186915 August 1949) was an Australian suffragist and social reformer. She was one of four female candidates at the 1903 federal election, the first at which women were eligible to stand.

Goldstein was born in Portland, Victoria. Her family moved to Melbourne in 1877 when she was around eight years old, where she would attend Presbyterian Ladies' College. Goldstein followed her mother into the women's suffrage movement and soon became one of its leaders, becoming known both for her public speaking and as an editor of pro-suffrage publications. Despite her efforts, Victoria was the last Australian state to implement equal voting rights, with women not granted the right to vote until 1908.

In 1903, Goldstein unsuccessfully contested the Senate as an independent, winning 16.8 percent of the vote. She was one of the first four women to stand for federal parliament, along with Selina Anderson, Nellie Martel, and Mary Moore-Bentley. Goldstein ran for parliament a further four times, and despite never winning an election won back her deposit on all but one occasion. She stood on left-wing platforms, and some of her more radical views alienated both the general public and some of her associates in the women's movement.

After women's suffrage was achieved, Goldstein remained prominent as a campaigner for women's rights and various other social reforms. She was an ardent pacifist during World War I, and helped found the Women's Peace Army, an anti-war organisation. Goldstein maintained a lower profile in later life, devoting most of her time to the Christian Science movement. Her death passed largely unnoticed, and it was not until the late 20th century that her contributions were brought to the attention of the general public.

Early life
Vida Jane Mary Goldstein was born in Portland, Victoria, the eldest child of Jacob Goldstein and Isabella (née Hawkins). Her father was an Irish immigrant and officer in the Victorian Garrison Artillery. Jacob, born at Cork, Ireland, on 10 March 1839 of Polish, Jewish and Irish stock, arrived in Victoria in 1858 and settled initially at Portland. He was commissioned a lieutenant in the Victorian Garrison Artillery in 1867 and rose to the rank of colonel. On 3 June 1868 he married Isabella (1849–1916), eldest daughter of Scottish-born squatter Samuel Proudfoot Hawkins. Her mother was a suffragist, a teetotaller and worked for social reform. Both parents were devout Christians with strong social consciences. They had four more children after Vida – three daughters (Lina, Elsie and Aileen) and a son (Selwyn).

After living in Portland and Warrnambool, the Goldsteins moved to Melbourne in 1877. Here Jacob became heavily involved in charitable and social welfare causes, working closely with the Melbourne Charity Organisation Society, the Women's Hospital Committee, the Cheltenham Men's Home and the labour colony at Leongatha. Although an anti-suffragist Jacob Goldstein believed strongly in education and self-reliance. He engaged a private governess to educate his four daughters and Vida was sent to Presbyterian Ladies' College in 1884, matriculating in 1886. When the family income was affected by the depression in Melbourne during the 1890s, Vida and her sisters, Aileen and Elsie, ran a co-educational preparatory school in St Kilda. Opening in 1892, the 'Ingleton' school would run out of the family home on Alma Road for the next six years.

Women's suffrage and involvement in politics

In 1891, Isabella Goldstein recruited the 22-year-old Vida to assist in collecting signatures for a women's suffrage petition. Historian, Clare Wright, states that "Vida's mother also led her eldest daughter into the work that would ultimately consume her life: the struggle for women's rights." She would stay on the periphery of the women's movement through the 1890s, but her primary interest during this period was with her school and urban social causes – particularly the National Anti-Sweating League and the Criminology Society. This work gave her first-hand experience of women's social and economic disadvantages, which she would come to believe were a product of their political inequality.

Through this work, she became friends with Annette Bear-Crawford, with whom she jointly campaigned for social issues including women's franchise and in organising an appeal for the Queen Victoria Hospital for women. After the death of Bear-Crawford in 1899, Goldstein took on a much greater organising and lobbying role for suffrage and became secretary for the United Council for Woman Suffrage. She became a popular public speaker on women's issues, orating before packed halls around Australia and eventually Europe and the United States. In 1902 she travelled to the United States, speaking at the International Women Suffrage Conference (where she was elected secretary), gave evidence in favour of female suffrage before a committee of the United States Congress, and attended the International Council of Women Conference. In 1903, as an independent with the support of the newly formed Women's Federal Political Association, she was a candidate for the Australian Senate, becoming one of the first women in the British Empire to stand for election to a national parliament (Australian women had won the right to vote in federal elections in 1902). She received 51,497 votes (nearly 5% of the total ballots) but failed to secure a Senate seat. The loss prompted her to concentrate on female education and political organisation, which she did through the Women's Political Association (WPA) and her monthly journal the Australian Women's Sphere, which she described as the "organ of communication amongst the, at one time few, but now many, still scattered, supporters of the cause". She stood for parliament again in 1910, 1913 and 1914; her fifth and last bid was in 1917 for a Senate seat on the principle of international peace, a position which lost her votes. She always campaigned on fiercely independent and strongly left-wing platforms which made it difficult for her to attract high support at the ballot. Her campaign secretary in 1913 was Doris Blackburn, later elected to the Australian House of Representatives.

Other activities
Through the 1890s to the 1920s, Goldstein actively supported women's rights and emancipation in a variety of fora, including the National Council of Women, the Victorian Women's Public Servants' Association and the Women Writers' Club. She actively lobbied parliament on issues such as equality of property rights, birth control, equal naturalisation laws, the creation of a system of children's courts and raising the age of marriage consent. Her writings in various periodicals and papers of the time were influential in the social life of Australia during the first twenty years of the 20th century.

In 1909, having closed the Sphere in 1905 to dedicate herself more fully to the campaign for female suffrage in Victoria, she founded a second newspaper – Woman Voter. It became a supporting mouthpiece for her later political campaigns. Of Australian suffragists in this period Goldstein was one of a handful to garner an international reputation. In the UK Adelaide-born Muriel Matters was at the forefront of peaceful public campaigns advocating for women's suffrage, and gained global attention for her part in The Grille Incident, which resulted in the dismantling of the grille which covered the Ladies' Gallery in the House of Commons. In early 1911 Goldstein visited England at the behest of the Women's Social and Political Union. Her speeches around the country drew huge crowds and her tour was touted as 'the biggest thing that has happened in the women movement for some time in England'. She included visits to Holiday Campaigns in the Lake District for Liverpool WPSU organiser Alice Davies, along with fellow activist and writer Beatrice Harraden. 

Eagle House near Bath in Somerset had become an important refuge for British suffragettes who had been released from prison. Mary Blathwayt's parents were the hosts and they planted trees there between April 1909 and July 1911 to commemorate the achievements of suffragettes including Adela's mother and sister, Christabel as well as Annie Kenney, Charlotte Despard, Millicent Fawcett and Lady Lytton.
The trees were known as "Annie's Arboreatum" after Annie Kenney. There was also a "Pankhurst Pond" within the grounds.

Goldstein was invited to Eagle House whilst she was in England. She planted a holly tree and a plaque would have been made and her photograph was recorded by Colonel Linley Blathwayt.

Her trip in England concluded with the foundation of Australia and New Zealand Women Voters Association, an organisation dedicated to ensuring that the British Parliament would not undermine suffrage laws in the antipodean colonies.   Goldstein invited suffragette Louie Cullen to speak of her experiences in the London movement.

She was quoted from the period as saying that woman represents "the mercury in the thermometer of the race. Her status shows to what degree it has risen out of barbarism." Australian feminist historian Patricia Grimshaw has noted that Goldstein, like other white women of her day, considered "barbarism" to characterise Australian Aboriginal society and culture; therefore Indigenous women in Australia were not believed to be eligible for citizenship or the vote.

Throughout the First World War Goldstein was an ardent pacifist, became chairman of the Peace Alliance and formed the Women's Peace Army in 1915. She recruited Adela Pankhurst, recently arrived from England as an organiser. In 1919 she accepted an invitation to represent Australian women at a Women's Peace Conference in Zurich. In the ensuing three-year absence abroad her public involvement with Australian feminism gradually ended, with the Women's Political Association dissolving and her publications ceasing print. She continued to campaign for several public causes and continued to believe fervently in the unique and unharnessed contributions of women in society. Her writings in later decades became decidedly more sympathetic to socialist and labour politics.

Later life
In the last decades of her life, her focus turned more intently to her faith and spirituality as a solution to the world's problems. She became increasingly involved with the Christian Science movement – whose Melbourne church she helped found. For the next two decades, she would work as a reader, practitioner and healer of the church. Despite many suitors, she never married and she lived in her last years with her two sisters, Aileen (who also never wed) and Elsie (the widow of Henry Hyde Champion). Vida Goldstein died of cancer at her home in South Yarra, Victoria on 15 August 1949, aged 80. She was cremated and her ashes scattered.

Posthumous
Although her death passed largely unnoticed at the time, Goldstein would later come to be recognised as a pioneer suffragist and important figure in Australian social history, and a source of inspiration for many later female generations. Second Wave Feminism led to a revival of interest in Goldstein and the publication of new biographies and journal articles.

In 1978, a street in the Canberra suburb of Chisholm was named Goldstein Crescent, honouring her work as a social reformer.

In 1984, the Division of Goldstein, a  federal electorate in Melbourne was named after her. Seats in her honour have been installed in the Parliament House Gardens in Melbourne, and in Portland, Victoria. 

The Women's Electoral Lobby in Victoria named an award after her. In 2008, the centenary of women's suffrage in Victoria, Goldstein's contribution was remembered.

In popular culture
Vida Goldstein is one of the six Australians whose war experiences are presented in The War That Changed Us, a four-part television documentary series about Australia's involvement in World War I.

Vida Goldstein appears as a major character in the Wendy James novel, Out of the Silence, which examined the case of Maggie Heffernan, a young Victorian woman who was convicted of drowning her infant son in Melbourne, in 1900.

Notes

References

Further reading
 Bomford, Janette M. (1993) That Dangerous and Persuasive Woman: Vida Goldstein, Carlton: Melbourne University Press. 
 Henderson, L. M. (1973) The Goldstein Story, Melbourne: Stockland Press. 
 Kent, Jacqueline (2020) Vida: A Woman For Our Time, Melbourne: Penguin. 
 Women's Political Association. (1913) The Life and Work of Miss Vida Goldstein. Melbourne: Australasian Authors' Agency.

External links
 Australian Women's Biographies published by the National Foundation for Australian Women
 Vida Goldstein's papers are held at The Women's Library at the Library of the London School of Economics, ref  7VDG
 
 Vida Goldstein biography compiled by Friends of St Kilda cemetery
 National Library of Australia Federation Gateway site
 Australian War Memorial Federation site recognising Goldstein as a peace activist
 Women's Electoral Lobby
 Photos of Vida Goldstein from the State Library of Victoria
 A radio program about Vida Goldstein
 ABC radio program on a biography of Vida Goldstein

1869 births
1949 deaths
Australian people of Irish descent
Australian people of Polish-Jewish descent
Australian people of Scottish descent
Australian Christian Scientists
Australian headmistresses
Australian feminist writers
Australian suffragists
Independent politicians in Australia
Candidates for Australian federal elections
People from Portland, Victoria
People educated at the Presbyterian Ladies' College, Melbourne
Australian pacifists
Deaths from cancer in Victoria (Australia)
19th-century Australian educators
20th-century Australian educators
Jewish feminists
Eagle House suffragettes
19th-century Australian women
20th-century Australian women politicians
19th-century women educators
20th-century women educators
Australian magazine founders
People from St Kilda, Victoria
Jewish suffragists